Sonelgaz (Société Nationale de l'Electricité et du Gaz, National Company for Electricity and Gas) is a state-owned utility in charge of electricity and natural gas distribution in Algeria. It was established in 1969, replacing the previous body Electricité et gaz d'Algérie (EGA), and was given a monopoly over the distribution and selling of natural gas within the country as well as the production, distribution, importation, and exportation of electricity. In 2002, its monopoly was revoked by presidential decree N° 02-195, which legally converted it into a private (though entirely government-owned) company; it is now scheduled to be split eventually. As of 2003, it produces 29 billion kWh a year, sells 4.6 billion cubic metres of gas a year, and employs nearly 20,000 people.

Chief executive officers
 Mohamed Arkab (2017-2019)
 Chahar Boulakhras (2019-2021)
 Mourad Adjal (2021-)

References

External links

 Official Sonelgaz website
 MBendi profile
 World Markets Analysis

Oil and gas companies of Algeria
Electric power companies of Algeria
Government-owned companies of Algeria
Companies based in Algiers
Energy companies established in 1969
Non-renewable resource companies established in 1969
1969 establishments in Algeria